"I Need You All the Time" is a song recorded by American country music group Blackhawk.  It was released in March 2000 as the first single from their Greatest Hits compilation album.  The song reached #40 on the Billboard Hot Country Singles & Tracks chart.  The song was written by Pat Bunch, Jimmy Price and Shane Teeters.

Chart performance

References

2000 singles
2000 songs
Blackhawk (band) songs
Songs written by Pat Bunch
Arista Nashville singles